Centrostephanus besnardi is a species of sea urchins of the family Diadematidae. Their armour is covered with spines. Centrostephanus besnardi was first scientifically described in 1955 by Bernasconi.

References 

Diadematidae
Animals described in 1955